Connie J. Ladenburg is an American politician of the Democratic Party. She served as a member of the Tacoma City Council, the Washington State House of Representatives and is now a member of the Pierce County Council.

Career 
Ladenburg was a member of the Washington House of Representatives, representing the 29th district.
She was elected to the Pierce County Council District 4, in November 2012.

Personal life 
Ladenburg's husband, John Ladenburg has served as Pierce County Executive and Pierce County Prosecuting Attorney.

References

Further reading
 Washington State Legislature biography page

Democratic Party members of the Washington House of Representatives
Pierce County Councillors
Living people
Politicians from Tacoma, Washington
Year of birth missing (living people)
Women state legislators in Washington (state)
21st-century American women